Nehmeh group of companies is one of the oldest and established multidisciplined business enterprises in the State of Qatar. Headquartered in Doha, the company was founded in 1955 by Antoine Nehme.

Subsidiaries

Anton Nehmeh Establishment 
As one of the oldest companies in operation in Qatar, Anton Nehmeh Establishment's offerings includes various performance tools and equipment for the automotive, construction, service and woodworking industries.

Nehmeh Entreprises & Industries 
Nehmeh Entreprises & Industries (formerly known as National Radiator Factory) was originally established in the early 1993 as the first manufacturer of heat exchangers in the country.

With a new corporate identity and a new facility, it has become the first manufacturing base of Air Handling Units to be made in Qatar.

References 

Conglomerate companies established in 1955
1955 establishments in Qatar
Conglomerate companies of Qatar
Companies based in Doha